Leedon is a former hamlet in Bedfordshire, England, which is now part of Leighton Buzzard town. Originally, Leedon was a small rural settlement and was part of the Eggington civil parish. However, the expansion of Leighton Buzzard eastwards led to Leedon being encompassed in the wider Leighton-Linslade urban area. Today, Leedon represents the eastern part of Leighton Buzzard town. At the 2011 Census the population of the hamlet was included in the civil parish of Leighton-Linslade

References

Leighton Buzzard
Former populated places in Bedfordshire